Rank comparison chart of officers for armies/land forces of Hispanophone states.

Officers

Warrant officers (WO5–W01)

See also
Comparative army officer ranks of the Americas
Ranks and insignia of NATO armies officers

References

Military ranks of Hispanophone countries
Military comparisons